The Circumcision is a title for some of the many paintings of the Circumcision of Jesus.  Examples with articles include:
 The Circumcision (Parmigianino)
 The Circumcision (Rubens)
 The Circumcision (Signorelli)
Circumcision of Christ (Guercino)
Adoration of the Magi (Mantegna); a side panel depicts the Circumcision
Roverella Altarpiece by Cosmè Tura; a predella panel depicts the Circumcision